The southern thorny skate (Amblyraja doellojuradoi) is a species of fish in the family Rajidae. It lives off the coast of Argentina and Uruguay (the southern tip of South America), and around the Falkland Islands in depths ranging from 51 to 642 m. Its maximum size is 69 cm. It lays oblong egg capsules with horn-like projections at the corners which are laid in sandy or muddy flats. The eggs measure 86.4 mm in length and 56.2 mm in width.

Etymology
The skate is named in honor of Argentine marine biologist Martín Doello-Jurado (1884–1948), of the Museo Argentino de Ciencias Naturales.

References

External links
 Species Description of Amblyraja doellojuradoi at www.shark-references.com

Fish described in 1935
Rajidae